"Death Dispatch" is the thirteenth episode of the second series of the 1960s cult British spy-fi television series The Avengers, starring Patrick Macnee and Honor Blackman. It was first broadcast by ABC on 22 December 1962. The episode was directed by Jonathan Alwyn and written by Leonard Fincham.

Plot
Steed and Cathy get a job as bait in South America, investigating the murder of a British courier in Jamaica.

Cast
 Patrick Macnee as John Steed
 Honor Blackman as Cathy Gale 
 Richard Warner as Miguel Rosas 
 David Cargill as Monroe
 Valerie Sarruf as Anna Rosas  
 Douglas Muir as One Ten 
 Gerald Harper as Travers  
 Hedger Wallace as Alan Baxter  
 Michael Forrest as Rico
 Maria Andipa as Singer, Conchita 
 Alan Mason as Pasco 
 Geoff L'Cise as Thug
 Arthur Griffiths as Thug
 Bernice Rassin as Chambermaid  
 Jerry Jardin as Customer

References

External links

Episode overview on The Avengers Forever! website

The Avengers (season 2) episodes
1962 British television episodes